How  may refer to:

 How (greeting), a word used in some misrepresentations of Native American/First Nations speech
 How, an interrogative word in English grammar

Art and entertainment

Literature
 How (book), a 2007 book by Dov Seidman
 HOW (magazine), a magazine for graphic designers
 H.O.W. Journal, an American art and literary journal

Music
 "How", a song by The Cranberries from Everybody Else Is Doing It, So Why Can't We?
 "How", a song by Maroon 5 from Hands All Over
 "How", a song by Regina Spektor from What We Saw from the Cheap Seats
 "How", a song by Daughter from Not to Disappear
 "How?" (song), by John Lennon

Other media
 HOW (graffiti artist), Raoul Perre, New York graffiti muralist
 How (TV series), a British children's television show
 How (video game), a platform game

People 
 How (surname)
 HOW (graffiti artist), Raoul Perre, New York graffiti muralist

Places 
 How, Cumbria, England
 How, Wisconsin, United States
 Howden railway station (station code: HOW), England

See also

 Hao (disambiguation)
 Hau (disambiguation)
 Howe (disambiguation)
 Howe (surname)
 

te:ఎలా